Jongsong Peak (Nepali: जोङ्सोङ् हिमाल) is a mountain in the Janak section of the Himalayas. At  it is the 57th highest peak in the world, although it is dominated by 3rd highest, Kangchenjunga,  to the south. Jongsong's summit is on tripoint of India, Nepal and China.

History 
From its first ascent in 1930 by members of German expedition led by Gunther Dyhrenfurth until the first ascent of Kamet on 21 June 1931, Jongsong was the highest climbed peak in the world. The first ascent team of Jongsong peak had included several members who were also members of the International mountaineering organisation Himalayan Club.

On 30 September 2012, a team from the Kolkata section of the Himalayan Club (Pradeep Sahoo (Leader) with Ang Dorji Sherpa and Phurba Sherpa), ascended the Jongsong peak's east summit (named Domo by Dyhrenfurth) on a new route via the eastern ridge of the Jongsong peak from a col between the Jongsong massif and an adjoining peak called Dome Kang.
The previous day, another team from the same expedition scaled Dome Kang (Rajib Mondal and Dawa Sherpa) from the common col along its east face (New route first ascent / second ascent overall). 
They had approached the mountains from the Jongsong glacier, Sikkim.

References

Mountains of Koshi Province
Mountains of Tibet
Mountains of Sikkim
International mountains of Asia
Seven-thousanders of the Himalayas
India–Nepal border
China–Nepal border
China–India border
Border tripoints